

See also
List of heritage railway stations in the United Kingdom

K